"Just Another Day..." is a single released from Queen Latifah's 1993 third studio album Black Reign. The song was written by Queen Latifah and Apache. The CD single version features New Jack Swing remixes by Teddy Riley and Lil' Chris Smith of Blackstreet. There are a total of 2 promo CD singles, 1 official Maxi CD and a Cassette Single, 1 official vinyl single, and 2 promo vinyl singles. The song was recorded in New York City.

"Just Another Day..." peaked at no. 54 on the Billboard Hot 100 during the week of April 2, 1994, and remained on the chart for 11 weeks.

The song recounts a seemingly average day in Latifah's neighborhood, which she refers to as the "hood". While Latifah's neighborhood may be dangerous, with stray bullets and the presence of police, Latifah is proud of where she is from and asserts that her neighborhood will be ok regardless of the what happens. The first line of the first verse ("well it's a beautiful day in the neighborhood, a beautiful day in the neighborhood") is a play on the infamous children's television show song, "Won't You Be My Neighbor?" from Mister Rogers' Neighborhood.

Sampling 
The song contains uncredited samples of Herb Alpert's "Making Love in the Rain" and Slick Rick's "Hey Young World". Logic's 2011 mixtape Young Sinatra interpolates Latifah's song in "Just Another Day (In My Mind)". The song was also featured in the 1994 HBO documentary Gang War: Bangin' In Little Rock about street gangs in Little Rock, Arkansas.

Music video 
The music video was directed by Mark Gerard. Originally, the video shows Latifah lip syncing to the end of the third verse, where she mouths an explicit lyrics. On Viacom owned channels, that portion of the video was edited and an alternate scene was shown.

Formats and track listings
Promo CD single # 1
 Radio Edit # LP version
 New Jack Remix Edit (Remixed by Teddy Riley, "Lil" Chris Smith)
 New Jack Remix Edit (Clean version) (Remixed by Teddy Riley, "Lil" Chris Smith)
 New Jack Remix (Remixed by Teddy Riley, "Lil" Chris Smith)
 New Jack Acapella # Instrumental

Promo CD single 2
 Pop Radio Edit
 LP version
 New Jack Pop Radio Edit (Remixed by Teddy Riley)
 New Jack Acapella
 Instrumental

Promo CD single # 3/Promo 12" vinyl single # 1
 It Feels Good, Yeah Remix edit (Clean version) (Remixed by Maseo) [Side A on promo vinyl]
 It Feels Good, Yeah Remix (Remixed by Maseo) [Side A on promo vinyl]
 New Jack Remix (Remixed by Teddy Riley) [Side B on promo vinyl]
 LP Version [Side B on promo vinyl]
 New Jack Acapella [Side B on promo vinyl]

Promo 12" vinyl single # 2
Side A
 Radio Edit
 LP Edit
 New Jack Remix Edit (Remixed by Teddy Riley, "Lil" Chris Smith)
 New Jack Remix (Remixed by Teddy Riley, "Lil" Chris Smith)
Side B
 New Jack Extended Remix (Remixed by Teddy Riley)
 Instrumental
 New Jack Percapella (Remixed by Teddy Riley)
 New Jack Acapella

US 12" vinyl single
Side A
 "Just Another Day..." LP Version
 "Just Another Day..." New Jack Remix (Remixed by Teddy Riley & "Lil" Chris Smith)
 "Just Another Day..." New Jack Percapella (Remixed by Teddy Riley, "Lil" Chris Smith)
Side B
 "Just Another Day..." New Jack Extended Remix (Remixed by Teddy Riley, "Lil" Chris Smith)
 "Just Another Day..." Instrumental
 "Just Another Day..." New Jack Acapella

US CD/Cassette maxi single
 "Just Another Day..." LP Version
 "Just Another Day..." New Jack Remix (Remixed by Teddy Riley, "Lil" Chris Smith)
 "Just Another Day..." New Jack Percapella (Remixed by Teddy Riley, "Lil" Chris Smith)
 "Just Another Day..." New Jack Extended Remix (Remixed by Teddy Riley, "Lil" Chris Smith)
 "U.N.I.T.Y." Big Titty Mix

References

1993 singles
Queen Latifah songs
Hardcore hip hop songs
1993 songs
Songs written by Queen Latifah
Motown singles
Black-and-white music videos